Victoria Bridge is a single-arch road bridge across the River Cam in Cambridge, England. It carries Victoria Avenue. Immediately to the north is Chesterton Road and a major junction with Victoria Road and Milton Road.

The bridge was built in 1889–90 to connect the then village of Chesterton (now a suburb) to the north with Cambridge to the south.  At the same time, Victoria Avenue was constructed to the south, dividing Jesus Green to the west from Midsummer Common to the east.

The foundation stone was laid by Frederic Wace, the mayor of Cambridge, on 4 November 1889 and the bridge was officially opened by Wace on 11 December 1890.  The bridge was rebuilt for strengthening in 1992.

See also 
 List of bridges in Cambridge
 Magdalene Bridge to the southwest
 Jesus Lock footbridge to the west
 Elizabeth Way Bridge to the east

References 

Bridges completed in 1890
Bridges across the River Cam
Bridges in Cambridge